Raising hands is a body gesture.

Raising hands may also refer to:

 Raising hands in Dua, a gesture during Dua in Islam